"Youniverse" is a song by Swedish singer Molly Sandén. The song was released in Sweden as a digital download on 28 February 2016, and was written by Sandén along with Danny Saucedo and John Alexis. It took part in Melodifestivalen 2016, and qualified to the final from the fourth semi-final. It placed sixth in the final.

Track listing

Charts

Certifications

Release history

References

2015 songs
2016 singles
Melodifestivalen songs of 2016
Swedish pop songs
Molly Sandén songs
English-language Swedish songs
Songs written by Danny Saucedo